Philochorus of Athens (c. 340 BC – c. 261 BC), was a Greek historian and Atthidographer of the third century BC, and a member of a priestly family. He was a seer and interpreter of signs, and a man of considerable influence.

Biography
Philochorus was strongly anti-Macedonian in politics, and a bitter opponent of Demetrius Poliorcetes. When Antigonus Gonatas, the son of the latter, besieged and captured Athens (261 BC), Philochorus was put to death for having supported Ptolemy II Philadelphus of Egypt, who had encouraged the Athenians in their resistance to Macedonia.

His investigations into the usages and customs of his native Attica were embodied in an Atthis, in seventeen books, a history of Athens from the earliest times to 262 BC. Considerable fragments are preserved in the lexicographers, scholiasts, Athenaeus, and elsewhere. The work was epitomized by the author himself, and later by Asinius Pollio of Tralles (perhaps a freedman of the famous Gaius Asinius Pollio).

Philochorus also wrote on oracles, divination and sacrifices; the mythology and religious observances of the tetrapolis of Attica; the myths of Sophocles; the lives of Euripides and Pythagoras; the foundation of Salamis, Cyprus. He compiled chronological lists of the archons and Olympiads, and made a collection of Attic inscriptions, the first of its kind in Greece.

Notes

References

Further reading
Greek text and commentary:  Felix Jacoby, Fragmente der griechischen Historiker, n. 328
English translation and commentary: Phillip Harding, The story of Athens: the fragments of the local chronicles of Attika (Routledge, London - New York 2008). 
Italian translation and commentary: Virgilio Costa, Filocoro di Atene. vol. I: I frammenti dell'Atthis (Edizioni TORED, Tivoli [Roma] 2007).

External links
Dictionary of Greek and Roman Biography and Mythology
Online translation of the fragments

Ancient Athenian historians
Hellenistic-era historians
3rd-century BC Greek people
3rd-century BC writers
3rd-century BC historians
Ancient Greek seers
Ancient Greek anthologists
340s BC births
260s BC deaths